Charity Rose Wakefield is an English actress.

Early life and education
Charity Wakefield was born in Tunbridge Wells 
Her first taste of acting was in an amateur dramatics school production of Sleeping Beauty in 1987.
Wakefield attended a three year acting course at Oxford School of Drama graduating in 2003. Besides acting, Wakefield plays the violin and has a strong soprano singing voice.

Career
Wakefield made her screen debut in 2004, in (Past Present Future) Imperfect. She starred in a BBC1 production of Rapunzel, in which Rapunzel is a young tennis star, and also appeared in Casualty 1907.

Her theatre credits include Yesterday Was a Weird Day, a production about the 2005 London bombings, Constance in The Three Musketeers at the Bristol Old Vic, and Elaine in The Graduate, at the New Vic; she met her future husband, David Newman, when they acted together in The Graduate. Wakefield's performance as Susan in Baby with the Bathwater at the Old Red Lion Theatre was called "fabulous." In 2008 Wakefield toured in a revival of W. Somerset Maugham's The Circle at the Chichester Festival Theatre, as well as working on the BBC comedy pilot Freddi. 

Wakefield played a lead role as Marianne Dashwood in the BBC production of Jane Austen's Sense and Sensibility. She appeared in the Channel 4 drama Any Human Heart and played the lead in the British film noir Scar Tissue. In March 2012 she was cast in Mockingbird Lane, the re-imagining of The Munsters for NBC.

Wakefield appeared as Mary Boleyn in the 2015 BBC2 television series Wolf Hall. She also appeared in the NBC drama The Player with Philip Winchester and Wesley Snipes.

On Christmas Day 2016, she was one of the principal guest stars in the BBC1 Doctor Who Christmas special "The Return of Doctor Mysterio".

In 2017, she appeared in two episodes of the ITV drama The Halcyon, playing Charity Lambert. Wakefield appeared in the main cast of both series (2017 and 2019) of the Sky One comedy drama Bounty Hunters, playing Leah Hoover, sister of the character of series co-creator and co-lead Jack Whitehall. 

In 2020, she was cast in a main role as Georgina Dymova in the Hulu's Historical comedy-drama The Great, alongside Elle Fanning and Nicholas Hoult.

Filmography

Film

Television

References

External links
 
 Post-It Love on YouTube

Living people
English television actresses
English stage actresses
English film actresses
Actresses from Sussex
Alumni of the Oxford School of Drama
21st-century English actresses
English radio actresses
Year of birth missing (living people)